The 1964 SCCA National Sports Car Championship season was the fourteenth and final season of the Sports Car Club of America's National Sports Car Championship. It began April 12, 1964, and ended October 31, 1964, after eleven races.

Schedule

 Feature race
 Non-championship event

Season results
Feature race overall winners in bold.

Champions

References

External links
World Sports Racing Prototypes: SCCA 1964
Racing Sports Cars: SCCA archive

SCCA National Sports Car Championship
Scca National Sports Car Championship
1964 in American motorsport